The 2014–15 Yale Bulldogs men's ice hockey team represented Yale University in the 2014–15 NCAA Division I men's ice hockey season. The team was coached by Keith Allain, '80, his ninth season behind the bench at Yale. His assistant coaches were Dan Muse, Jason Guerriero, Josh Siembida, and Stephen Volek. The Bulldogs played their home games at Ingalls Rink on the campus of Yale University, competing in the ECAC.

Offseason

Three Senior Bulldogs graduated in May: Captain Jesse Root – F, Kenny Agostino – F, and Gus Young – D

Senior defensemen Tommy Fallen was named Captain for the 2014–15 season.

Recruiting
Yale added five freshmen for the 2014–15 season: three forwards, and two defensemen.

2014-15 Roster

Departures from 2013–2014 team
Kenny Agostino, F - Graduation - Signed a contract with the Calgary Flames, currently playing for the AHL Affiliate, Calgary Flames.
Jesse Root, F - Graduation - Signed a contract with the Dallas Stars, currently playing for the AHL Affiliate, Texas Stars.
Gus Young, D - Graduation - Signed a contract with the Worcester Sharks

2014-15 Bulldogs
As of February 20, 2015.

Coaching staff

Standings

Schedule

|-
!colspan=12 style="color:white; background:#00356B" | Exhibition

|-
!colspan=12 style="color:white; background:#00356B" | Regular Season

|-
!colspan=12 style="color:white; background:#00356B" | ECAC Tournament

|-
!colspan=12 style="color:white; background:#00356B" | NCAA Tournament

On November 2, the Bulldogs beat Connecticut 2-1 to win the Liberty Hockey Invitational at the Prudential Center.
On January 2, Yale's John Hayden was away, representing the United States at the 2015 World Juniors in Montreal, Quebec and Toronto, Ontario, Canada. The US lost to Russia in the quarterfinal.
On January 10, the Bulldogs won the 2nd edition of Rivalry on Ice with a 4-1 win over Harvard in Madison Square Garden.
On January 20, the Bulldogs tied for the Heroes Hat with a 2-2 tie with host Quinnipiac.
On February 27, the Bulldogs secured a 1st-round bye in the ECAC playoffs, and will host a quarterfinals matchup at Ingalls Rink.
On March 5, the Ivy League announced the season's Awards recipients and the All-League teams. Rob O'Gara and Alex Lyon were named to the All-Ivy first team, with John Hayden making the All-Ivy second teams. Ryan Hitchcock was unanimously selected as Ivy League Rookie of the Year. Additionally, Keith Allain was unanimously selected as the Ivy League Coach of the Year.
On March 15, the Bulldogs were defeated by the Harvard Crimson in the quarterfinals of the ECAC tournament, losing the best of three series in three games. Harvard took game 1 by a score of 2-3, but Yale tied the series by winning game 2 and 3 by scores of 2-0. In the 3rd and final game of the series Harvard won 2-3 with the game-winning goal in the 2nd overtime period.
On March 20, ECAC Hockey announced the season's Awards recipients and the All-Conference teams. Rob O'Gara and Alex Lyon were named to the All-League first team. Rob O'Gara was named ECAC's best Defensive Defenseman, while Alex Lyon was selected as the Ken Dryden Goaltender of the Year. Additionally, the Bulldogs were award the Sportsmanship Trophy.
On March 22, the NCAA tournament Selection Committee placed Yale as the 4-seed in the Northeast Regional at Manchester, playing 1-seed Boston University in the first round.
On March 27, Yale lost to 1-seed Boston University by a score of 3-2 in the first round.

Rankings

Statistics
As of March 20, 2015.

Skaters

Goaltenders

Awards and honors

Weekly awards

ECAC Goaltender of the Week
Alex Lyon, G – Week of November 18, 2014
Alex Lyon, G – Week of February 2, 2015

Postseason awards

Ivy League All-Stars

Rob O'Gara, D – 1st Team All-Ivy
Alex Lyon, G – 1st Team All-Ivy
John Hayden, F – 2nd Team All-Ivy

Ivy League Awards

Ryan Hitchcock, F – Ivy League Rookie of the Year
Keith Allain – Ivy League Head Coach of the Year

ECAC All-Stars

Rob O'Gara, D – 1st Team All-League
Alex Lyon, G – 1st Team All-League

ECAC Awards

Rob O'Gara, D – Best Defensive Defenseman
Alex Lyon, G – Ken Dryden Goaltender of the Year
Yale University Bulldogs – Sportsmanship Trophy

References

Yale Bulldogs men's ice hockey seasons
Yale Bulldogs
Yale
Yale Bulldogs
Yale Bulldogs